The  Walter Hallstein Prize (German: Walter-Hallstein-Preis) is a prize that, from 2002 to 2008, was awarded every November by the Goethe University Frankfurt, the town of Frankfurt am Main and the Dresdner Bank AG for outstanding services to the cause of European integration. The prize had a cash value of  20,000 euros.

The award ceremony was held in the Römer in Frankfurt and used to be part of the Hallstein Colloquium, which is an academic  colloquium organized by the Wilhelm Merton Centre for European Integration and International Economic Order at the  University of Frankfurt. The prize was named after Walter Hallstein, the president of the first commission of the  European Economic Community.

Laureates 
2002 Ralf Dahrendorf
2003 Gil Carlos Rodríguez Iglesias, president of the European Court of Justice from 1994 to 2003
2004 Wim Duisenberg, former president of the European Central Bank
2005 Jean-Claude Juncker, Prime Minister of Luxembourg
2006 Vaira Vīķe-Freiberga, President of Latvia
2007 Hans-Gert Pöttering, President of the European Parliament
2008 Claudio Magris, Italienischer author

References

External links 
 Walter Hallstein Symposium

German awards